is a Japanese rock duo founded in 2017 represented by Universal Music Japan. The group is composed of N-buna, a vocaloid music producer, and Suis, a female vocalist. They are known for their juxtaposition of "passionate" and "upbeat" production and instrumentation fused with heavier lyrical content, which often explore ideas such as love and human emotion and draw from works of literature including Masuji Ibuse and Jules Verne. The name "Yorushika" is taken from a lyric in their song : . The eye-designed logo mark is a motif of two moons facing each other and also serves as a clock hand, portraying the time "from 6:00 to night".

The duo is extremely secretive, never publicly revealing their faces or holding many concerts. To date, Yorushika has only held three concerts, one in July 2017, one in August 2019, and another in January 2021.

History 
Prior to the formation of Yorushika, N-buna already had a sizeable following on Niconico, a Japanese video hosting website, first releasing vocaloid music on the platform in 2012. His 2013 song  reached first on the platform's daily vocaloid ranking. Additionally, he has produced two albums through U&R Records, a subsidiary of Niconico's owner Dwango.

According to an interview with Natalie, N-buna and Suis met through a common acquaintance; Suis was a longtime fan of N-buna's vocaloid work. Suis first appeared as a guest vocalist during N-buna's two solo concerts in Tokyo. N-buna reached out to Suis to form Yorushika as part of N-buna's effort to find a "more human" voice to use in his music, as opposed to vocaloid. Since then, the two have released three extended plays and three full albums, all of which charted on both the Oricon Albums Chart and the Billboard Japan Hot 100 Albums Chart. Yorushika's popularity grew explosively, with critics noting that the lyrics seemed to strike a chord with younger audiences. Additionally, the song  also became popular in video app TikTok.

As of November 2019, their faces and detailed profiles have not been disclosed as they want their audiences to listen to their music without "preconceptions". They have hosted live performances before, but the etiquette of concerts in Japan is a strict no-image policy until told otherwise. 

In 2020, they provided the theme song  and ending song  for the animated film A Whisker Away.

In 2021, Suis provided the ending theme  to the Japanese version of the Disney film Luca.

In 2022, they provided the theme song  "Sayuumou" (左右盲) and "Chinokate" (チノカテ) for the Japanese TV drama "Renovation like Magic" (魔法のリノベ, Mahō no rinobe).

Members 
 n-buna (pronounced nabuna) – music, arrangement
 suis (pronounced su-i) – vocals

Discography

Albums

Extended plays

Accolades

Videography

Music videos

References

External links
 
 Yorushika at Oricon 

Musical groups established in 2017
2017 establishments in Japan
Japanese pop music groups
Japanese rock music groups
Vocaloid musicians
Japanese musical duos
Rock music duos